Dorcoceras are a genus of flowering plants in the African violet family Gesneriaceae, native to Assam, Southeast Asia, China and central Malesia. They were resurrected from Boea in 2016.

Species
Currently accepted species include:
 
Dorcoceras brunneum C.Puglisi
Dorcoceras geoffrayi (Pellegr.) C.Puglisi
Dorcoceras glabrum C.Puglisi
Dorcoceras hygrometrica Bunge
Dorcoceras philippense (C.B.Clarke) Schltr.
Dorcoceras wallichii (R.Br.) C.Puglisi

References

Didymocarpoideae
Gesneriaceae genera
Taxa named by Alexander von Bunge